Ricky Sanders (born July 30, 1966) is an American former stock car racing driver. He raced part-time in the NASCAR Craftsman Truck Series from 2000 to 2003.

Racing career

Busch Series
Sanders only ran one career NASCAR Busch Series race. It came in 2001, when Jimmy Means allowed Sanders to pilot his #52 in a start-and-park deal. Sanders started 39th, but parked six laps into the race. He finished 41st.

Craftsman Truck Series
Sanders made his Truck debut in 2000, driving for Walsh Racing. He made his first start in the #9 Walsh Ford at Texas, where he started 32nd and wound up 30th. He also added on a 22nd at Kentucky before moving onto the #27 Hastings Filters Ford for three more starts. After finishes of 26th and 31st, Sanders set his season best finish of 16th in his return to Texas. It would wind up being his best career finish.

Sanders ran 13 races in 2001, en route to 27th in points. It was a miserable year for Sanders, who joined the #19 James Murphy Ford team. He only managed a best finish of 20th at Nashville, although he did finish in the top-25 in half of his starts. Sanders struggled with finishing races, as his team only completed 7 of their 13 starts.

Sanders' low-budget team only managed to make three starts in 2002. However, Sanders had a productive year. He was 19th in the season opener at Daytona. After a 32nd at Las Vegas, Sanders managed a 21st at California, earning two top-21s in three 2002 starts.

Sanders' team made six starts in 2003. It was a decent year for Sanders and his team, as they earned top-20 finishes in half of their starts. Their best was a 17th at Texas, 19th at Kentucky and 20th at Gateway. However, the budget issue finally bit. Sanders and team had to close up shop following the Nashville race.

Sports car racing
Today, Sanders is a competitor in SCCA's Trans-Am competition, in TA2. He drives for his own single-car team which he self-sponsors through his company Pitboxes.com.

Motorsports career results

NASCAR
(key) (Bold – Pole position awarded by qualifying time. Italics – Pole position earned by points standings or practice time. * – Most laps led.)

Busch Series

Craftsman Truck Series

ARCA Racing Series
(key) (Bold – Pole position awarded by qualifying time. Italics – Pole position earned by points standings or practice time. * – Most laps led.)

References

External links
 Ricky Sanders Racing
 

1966 births
ARCA Menards Series drivers
Living people
NASCAR drivers
People from Stockbridge, Georgia
Racing drivers from Atlanta
Racing drivers from Georgia (U.S. state)